The Scion bbX was first concept car to be revealed by Toyota for its daughter company, Scion. The concept was first shown at the New York International Auto Show in 2003. The design of the bbX was the basis for the Scion xB, which was sold for two generations from 2003 to 2015.

External links 
Unofficial Scion bbx site

bbX